Saddle Leather Law is a 1944 American Western film directed by Benjamin H. Kline and written by Elizabeth Beecher. The film stars Charles Starrett, Dub Taylor, Vi Athens, Lloyd Bridges, Jimmy Wakely and Salty Holmes. The film was released on December 21, 1944, by Columbia Pictures.

Plot

Cast          
Charles Starrett as Steve Carlisle
Dub Taylor as Cannonball 
Vi Athens as Jane Fielding
Lloyd Bridges as Paul Edwards
Jimmy Wakely as Jimmy 
Salty Holmes as Salty
Reed Howes as Reardon
Robert Kortman as Choate
Frank LaRue as Dr. Roberts
Ted French as Quinn
Ed Cassidy as Sheriff Tinsley
Steve Clark as Deputy Sheriff Jones
Budd Buster as Sheriff Burke
Nolan Leary as Minister
Joseph Eggenton as George Walker
William Gould as Hiram Denton
Netta Packer as Matilda

References

External links
 

1944 films
American Western (genre) films
1944 Western (genre) films
Columbia Pictures films
American black-and-white films
1940s English-language films
1940s American films